Cesare d'Este (8 October 1562  – 11 December 1628) was Duke of Modena and Reggio from 1597 until his death.

Biography 

Born in Ferrara, Cesare was the son of Alfonso d'Este, Marquis of Montecchio, fourth son of Alfonso I d'Este and the cousin of Alfonso II d'Este, duke of Ferrara and Modena.

When the latter died without heirs in the October 1597, Cesare inherited the duchy.

The legitimacy of the succession was recognised by the Emperor Rudolph II but not by Pope Clement VIII: thus, as Ferrara was nominally a Papal fief, the city was returned to the Papal States, despite the attempts of the young duke, who sought help from the major powers to no avail..

The capital was therefore moved to Modena, which he entered on 30 January 1598. His first years were troublesome: he had to face the quarrels between the Modenese and Ferrarese nobles who had come with him, the attempt at independence of Maro Pio of Sassuolo, and a war against Lucca for the possession of Garfagnana.

Marriage and issue 
On 30 January 1586, he married Virginia de' Medici, daughter of Cosimo I de' Medici, who suffered increasing symptoms of madness until her death in 1615. He was succeeded by his son, Alfonso.
 Giulia d'Este (1588–1645) died unmarried;
 Alfonso III d'Este, Duke of Modena (1591–1644), father of Francesco I d'Este, Duke of Modena;
 Laura d'Este (1594–1630) married Alessandro I Pico, Duke of Mirandola and had issue;
 Luigi d'Este, Lord of Montecchio and Scandiano (1593/1594–1664), had issue;
 Caterina d'Este (1595–1618) died unmarried;
 Anna Eleonora d'Este (1597–1651), died unmarried, nun
 Ippolito d'Este (1599–1647) died unmarried;
 Niccolo d'Este (1601–1640) married Sveva d'Avalos, no issue;
 Borso d'Este (1605–1657) married Ippolita d'Este (daughter of his brother Luigi) and had issue (including Maria Angela Caterina d'Este);
 Foresto d'Este (1606–1639/1640);

External links

Il Castello Estense: genealogical tree

|-

1562 births
1628 deaths
Nobility from Ferrara
Cesare
Cesare
Cesare
16th-century Italian nobility
17th-century Italian nobility
Burials at the Corpus Domini Monastery, Ferrara